Dang may be :

Dang Tharu language
Sedang language
Tungag language
Kedang language